Mussaenda raiateensis, commonly known as the Pacific mussaenda or Pacific flag-tree, is a plant of family Rubiaceae native to Tonga, Samoa, the Cook Islands and Society Islands in the South Pacific Ocean.

References

raiateensis
Flora of Tonga
Flora of the Cook Islands